Ravil Shamsiyevich Fazleyev (born February 15, 1960) is a Russian former professional ice hockey defenceman. He played 11 games with the  Gorky Torpedo of the Soviet Championship League during the 1986–87 season.

Personal
His son, Radel Fazleyev, was selected by the Philadelphia Flyers in the 6th round (168th overall) of the 2014 NHL Entry Draft.

References

External links

1960 births
Living people
Russian ice hockey defencemen
Torpedo Nizhny Novgorod players